Nornalup Inlet ( /ˈnoːnələp ˈɪnlət/ Australian English) is an estuarine body of water on the south coast of the South West of Australia, approximately  from Perth.

The name is Noongar in origin, meaning "the place of the tiger snake" (Notechis scutatus).

The estuary is wave dominated and is mostly not modified but the catchment has been substantially cleared. The inlets have a naturally low turbidity but have a high sediment trapping efficiency.

The Walpole - Nornalup inlet system is the only permanently open estuarine system in the South West, giving it great biological diversity.

The Casuarina Isles and Goose Island lie off the coast just to the south of the inlet

Remains of Aboriginal rock fish traps can still be found in the inlets. The main sea grasses found in the inlet are Ruppia megacarpa and Heterozostera tasmanica.

Captain Thomas Bannister and his party visited the inlet in 1831, although sealers had been based in the area since before 1826.

Both estuaries, with the tidal parts of the tributary rivers, were considered as a proposed marine park in 2006. The marine park is  well established, also including the tidal zones of the Frankland, Deep and Walpole Rivers.

References

Estuaries of Western Australia
Inlets of Western Australia
South coast of Western Australia